WVXF, virtual and UHF digital channel 17, is a dual This TV/Fox-affiliated television station serving the United States Virgin Islands that is licensed to Charlotte Amalie, Saint Thomas. Owned by Caribbean Broadcasting Network, it is a sister station to low-powered NBC affiliate WVGN-LD (channel 19). WVXF's transmitter is located on Signal Hill.

The station broadcasts Fox programming in high definition on its second digital subchannel, with This TV on the main channel in standard definition; this is a quirk of the Fox subchannel's former analog home of WEON-LP, which had a high definition simulcast placed on WVXF-DT2 until the station went dark in order to consolidate Caribbean Broadcasting Network's Virgin Islands operations onto WVXF.

Viya Cable carries WVXF-DT2 on channel 6, and WVXF-DT1 on channel 9. WVXF is also available in Puerto Rico on Liberty, and as part of the Puerto Rico locals package on Dish Network.

History
WVXF signed on for the first time on July 1, 1999 as a CBS affiliate. Prior to WVXF's sign-on, CBS programming was seen on Charlotte Amalie's WBNB-TV (channel 10). However, that station went dark permanently following Hurricane Hugo in 1989, when its transmitter was destroyed and the cash-strapped Benedek Broadcasting (owner of several network affiliates in small and mid-sized markets on the mainland) could not afford to rebuild; Benedek retained that station's license until 1995, when it was surrendered on grounds of abandonment. Starting in 1990, CBS service was only available by satellite via  network flagship WCBS-TV (from New York) and later Erie, Pennsylvania affiliate WSEE-TV (which became available on the Primetime 24 package in 1997); the latter is currently carried by most cable and satellite providers in the Caribbean.

On July 1, 2009, shortly after the digital television transition, WVXF switched affiliations, from CBS to This TV. Since July 13, CBS programming is available on TV2. In preparation, DirecTV and Dish Network dropped WVXF in favor of WSEE-TV shortly before the affiliation change (the station has since returned to Dish Network).

In January 2010, WVXF rebranded as EFN Caribbean, adding some syndicated shows and a local fashion-oriented program, Fashion Today, to its This TV programming. The station relaunched once more on May 1, 2011, joining Disney-ABC's Live Well Network as its first primary-channel affiliate, along with giving WEON's Fox feed a high definition home on the second subchannel, which eventually became its sole channel when WEON-LP went dark on December 31, 2011. In late 2014, WVXF-DT1 reverted to This TV, ahead of Live Well ending national distribution in April 2015.

Digital television

Digital channels
The station's digital signal is multiplexed:

References

External links

Television channels and stations established in 1999
1999 establishments in the United States Virgin Islands
VXF
Fox network affiliates
This TV affiliates